Sukh Nandan Kumar is an Indian politician and member of the Bharatiya Janata Party. Kumar is a member of the Jammu and Kashmir Legislative Assembly from the Marh constituency in Jammu district.
He is very popular among the youth of Jammu district. He has been elected two times from the Marh Constituency.

References 

People from Jammu
Bharatiya Janata Party politicians from Jammu and Kashmir
Living people
21st-century Indian politicians
Year of birth missing (living people)
Jammu and Kashmir MLAs 2008–2014
Jammu and Kashmir MLAs 2014–2018